Sidney Macey (4 March 1861 – 13 February 1935), better known by his stage name Cyrus Dare, was an English actor and society entertainer in the Victorian and Edwardian eras.

Early life
Sidney Macey was born in Covent Garden, London on 4 March 1861, the eldest son of Sidney Macey, a Fishing Tackle manufacturer, and his wife Martha (nee Tyler).

Stage career
Macey started acting on the West End stage at the age of ten, appearing in plays such as East Lynne, The Octoroon and Uncle Tom's Cabin.

As a young man, Macey worked as a Theatrical Performer, before becoming a Society Entertainer (initially performing under the stage name Professor Macey) providing Drawing Room entertainment at the piano at Society House parties, most notably those hosted by Albert Rothschild M.P. of Halton Park, Aylesbury, Buckinghamshire. He also played on numerous occasions before Queen Victoria and, later, King Edward V11.

In 1895, Macey entered Vaudeville, taking the stage name Cyrus Dare  and frequently appeared on the same play bills as such luminaries as Dan Leno and Marie Lloyd.

In 1896-1897, Macey toured America with Albert Chevalier and, on 11 January 1897, performed before President Cleveland at the Columbia Theatre, Washington, as recorded in The Washington DC Evening Times the following day: "When Cyrus Dare came out...and sang in a baby's voice a baby's song, the Presidential dignity was cast to the wind, and the big man roared. The climax of his enjoyment was reached, however, when the baby's head fell off. Then he grew red in the face and threw himself back in his chair so hard that Secretary Olney had to save him from falling. To thousands in the audience the President's pleasure in the baby prattle - though done by a man - suggested that office-seekers had best at once cultivate infantile voices and manners. Mrs. Cleveland seemed to share the President's pleasure, doubtless with thoughts of little ones at home."

Macey toured America again in 1899-1900, this time performing before President McKinley. It was reported that the President paid little attention to the performance until Cyrus Dare appeared; then, leaning forward, the President became more and more interested in the clever entertainment, until finally he buried his face in his hands and wept with laughter. "You are amused, Mr. President", said someone in the box. "Amused", replied McKinley. "Why, I should think so. If the fellow stays in the country long we shall have to introduce the 'laughing tariff'".

Blessed with fine tenor and falsetto voices, Macey composed over 200 songs, among the most famous being Johnny Jones And Me! (1896), The Unfortunate Child (1901), Forget-Me-Not (1906) and The Burglar and the Child (1912). According to his obituary, he was the first evening dress artiste to play a piano on the stage and the first child mimic on the stage. He was also one of the 600 founders of the Variety Artists' Benevolent Institution, Brinsworth House in Twickenham and did much to raise the standard of the variety stage.

Macey continued to work as a Society Entertainer and in Vaudeville until the outbreak of the First World War, when he retired from the stage after a career spanning more than four decades.

Inventor
In the early 1890s, Macey briefly returned to the family business of Fishing Tackle manufacturing, founding Sidney Macey Inimitable Fly Works, of Bates Hill, Redditch, Worcestershire and patenting several fishing tackle inventions.

For a while, Macey also ran a publishing house, Lucas Brothers, in Fleet Street, London and patented The Vampola, a mechanical vamp which, when placed on a piano, enabled the performer to play in any key.

Dare & Dare
After WW1, Macey and his son Leonard founded Dare & Dare, a firm of Auctioneers, Surveyors, House Land and Estate Agents, in Barnes and Surbiton. They were both elected Fellows of the Incorporated Association of Architects and Surveyors ("IAAS") (now the Chartered Association of Building Engineers).

Family
Macey's father was born in Chilmark, Wiltshire, where the Macey family (also spelt Macy/Macye/Macie/Maycie) had resided since before the Reformation (John Macye alias Banston, a yeoman farmer, was granted a copyhold tenancy of land in Chilmark by the last Abbess of Wilton in 1539; and his forebear, William Banston, a stone mason from Normandy in France, was recorded as being a householder in Chilmark in the first ever alien subsidy (a tax levied upon first-generation immigrants) in 1440 ). Macey was thus distantly related to the progenitor of the American Macy family, Thomas Macy (1608–1682) and his descendants (including the founder of Macy's department store, Rowland Hussey Macy (30 August 1822 – 29 March 1877), the industrialist Valentine Everit Macy (23 March 1871 – 21 March 1930) and the actor William H Macy (born 13 March 1950)).

Macey married Alice Lloyd Watson, daughter of Thomas Watson, Gentleman, on 30 August 1890, and had 3 children: Madeline Alice Macey (1891-1983), Leonard Sidney Macey (1894-1976) and Doris Lenore Macey (1895-1980) (all usually known as Dare).

Macey died in London on 13 February 1935 and was cremated at Golders Green.

By deed poll dated 7 May 1924 and enrolled in the Supreme Court of Judicature on 13 May 1924, Macey's son, Leonard, formally changed the family surname to Macey-Dare.

References

1861 births
1935 deaths
People from Covent Garden
19th-century English male actors
English male stage actors
20th-century English male actors
English inventors
19th-century British inventors
20th-century British inventors